El abuelo y yo (English: Grandfather and I), is a Mexican TV series produced by Pedro Damián for Televisa in 1992.

Frances Ondiviela, Marcelo Buquet, Ludwika Paleta, Gael García Bernal and Jorge Martinez de Hoyos star as the main protagonists, while Flor Eduarda Gurrola, Wendy de los Cobos and  Ivette Proal star as the main antagonists.

Plot 

Alejandra and Daniel are two kids who live in opposite worlds, but are united by friendship and dreams.

Alejandra is a sweet and tender girl who lives in a world of dreams full of gardens, beautiful dresses, many hats and fairy tales. She is a girl full of fantasies and desires of magical adventures, her parents are wealthy and Alejandra has everything she desires, but that world is far away from Daniel's, a child who has been orphaned, and has made the streets his home since the death of his mother. He is helpless and unknown to his relatives. Daniel only knows that his maternal grandfather never forgave his mother for marrying the wrong man.

Little Daniel, who lives with his dog "Anselmo", first meets don Joaquín, an old musician performer that has now become grumpy and solitary. Daniel believes that the two can be great friends, never imagining that Don Joaquín is actually his grandfather. Daniel then meets Alejandra and together begin to explore new worlds filled with fun, all thanks to don Joaquín who becomes their guide and teaches them the true meaning of friendship and how to remain children. Don Joaquín provides the children with love and affection while also teaching them to use their imagination to travel to strange worlds and to dream things the children have failed to do by solving problems that did not correspond to them.

Ultimately, Daniel and Don Joaquín find they are grandfather and grandson and follow their path together without Alejandra.

Cast 

Frances Ondiviela as Fernanda Irigoyen de Diaz-Uribe
Marcelo Buquet as Gerardo
Jorge Martínez de Hoyos as Don Joaquín
Ludwika Paleta as Alejandra
Gael García Bernal as Daniel
Adalberto Martínez as Lucas
Evangelina Elizondo as Sofía
Alfonso Iturralde as René
Raúl Buenfil as Damián
Beatriz Moreno as Lola
Ivette Proal as Yolanda
Héctor del Puerto as Don Lupe
Wendy de los Cobos as Mayra
Leo Rojo as Raúl
Jesús Vargas as Fonseca
Antonio Brillas as Father José
Josefina Escobedo as Sra. Lizardi
Alan Gutiérrez as Rosendo
Flor Eduarda Gurrola as Yoya
Julián de Tavira as Emiliano
Jorge Poza as Perico
Osvaldo Benavides as Paco 
Eugenio Polgovsky as Eugenio
Felipe Colombo as Felipín
Billy Méndez as Billy
Diego Luna as Luis
Jorge Salinas as Ernesto
Eduardo Santamarina as Ulises
Alejandro Bracho as Joel Chuvila

Awards and nominations

References

External links 

1992 telenovelas
Televisa telenovelas
1992 Mexican television series debuts
1992 Mexican television series endings
Mexican telenovelas
Spanish-language telenovelas
Television series about children